Cathedral Mission High School is an English-medium boys' school located at Bhowanipore.

History
The school was established in 1925 and is affiliated to the West Bengal Board of Secondary Education for Madhyamik Pariksha, and to the West Bengal Council of Higher Secondary Education for Higher Secondary Examination. The school comes under the Diocese of Calcutta of the Church of North India.

See also
Education in India
List of schools in India
Education in West Bengal

References

External links 

Church of North India schools
Boys' schools in India
Christian schools in West Bengal
High schools and secondary schools in Kolkata
Educational institutions established in 1925
1925 establishments in India